We The Curious (previously At-Bristol or "@Bristol") is a science and arts centre and educational charity in Bristol, England.  It features over 250 interactive exhibits over two floors, and members of the public and school groups can also engage with the Live Science Team over programming in the kitchen, studio and on live lab. We The Curious is also home of the United Kingdom's first 3D planetarium. The centre describes its aim as being "to create a culture of curiosity".

As part of its charitable status, We The Curious has an extensive community engagement programme. In regular weekends throughout the year We The Curious hosts "Hello!" weekends for communities who are currently under-represented in their visitors while also providing a community membership for charities and groups working in and for the community. Alongside this, We The Curious is working with local schools and community groups to plan exhibits and programming for the future.

History

Background and origins 
At-Bristol opened in 2000 as the successor to the Exploratory, a science museum and demonstration centre, founded by Richard Gregory in the former terminus train shed at Bristol Temple Meads railway station (later home to the British Empire & Commonwealth Museum). The Exploratory was a separate organisation and none of the exhibits or staff were transferred when Bristol's new museum opened in a city centre site as part of the regeneration of the historical Floating Harbour. The project was funded with £44.3 million from the National Lottery, Millennium Commission, South West of England Regional Development Agency, and a further £43.4 million from commercial partners (including a controversial donation from Nestlé) and Bristol City Council. The selection and design of exhibits were criticised by Gregory and other scientific adviser as being "totally inappropriate to the spirit of science". Goéry Delacôte served as Chief Executive from 2005 until 2012.

The centre is situated on the former Canon's Wharf. The goods shed was one of the first buildings to use reinforced concrete and both buildings are Grade II listed buildings. The buildings are located around Millennium Square – also part of the regeneration — and Pero's Bridge, a footbridge across the harbour which links it to the Arnolfini art gallery, Bristol Industrial Museum and Queen Square.

At its opening the centre consisted of Explore, a more traditional style hands-on science centre, which contained features on mechanics, sound and light, computer science, space and the human brain; Wildwalk, a biodiversity centre showcasing life on earth through a mix of live animals and plants, multimedia footage and exhibits and hands-on activities, including an artificial rainforest, aquariums and other ecology-related exhibits; and an IMAX theatre.

Closure of Wildwalk and IMAX 

Wildwalk and the IMAX Theatre closed at the end of March 2007 due to lower popularity with the public, running cost and a lack of funding and government support. Despite At-Bristol's insistence that the government should have supported Wildwalk, the science centres that were established by the Millennium Commission in 2000 were intended to be self-financing, once established. This proved difficult for some of the 18 centres established in 2000, with The Earth Centre, Big Idea and Wildwalk all closing within 10 years.

The Wildwalk building was converted into an aquarium by Blue Reef Aquarium, with the IMAX cinema being used to show nature and wildlife films. The Aquarium owners took the decision to stop screening IMAX films in November 2011, but the space is still used for venue hire events.

Though the charity had no problems securing short term funds and grants to cover this when the centre was set up, enabling them to run the three attractions for just over six years, by 2005/2006 most of these had either decreased greatly or ended altogether.

This left only two options: close the whole centre, or close Wildwalk and IMAX, enabling existing funds to be channelled exclusively to Explore. As Explore was more popular with visitors, and Wildwalk and the IMAX theatre were more expensive to run, it was decided that the second option was viable, and in this way Explore could become financially viable in the future.

For these reasons, Wildwalk and the IMAX theatre closed for the last time on Saturday, 31 March 2007, making 45 people redundant.

The Regional Development Agency worked alongside Bristol City Council to find new uses for the buildings, and at the same time the University of the West of England expressed an interest in taking over the buildings to use for public outreach work with schools.

In April 2008 it was announced that the Wildwalk building was to be converted into an aquarium and that the IMAX would be used to show nature and wildlife films. The £4 million plan by Newquay firm Blue Reef Aquarium, intended to provide a site for tropical marine and freshwater creatures, which opened in October 2009.

2010–2017
Explore rebranded to At-Bristol in June 2010. Since opening in 2000, At-Bristol had had an annual operating deficit of around £1.5 million to be filled by fundraising.

Rebrand as We The Curious 
In September 2017, At-Bristol reopened as We The Curious, with a new mission to "create a culture of curiosity", in response to a consultation showing that the previous mission to "make science accessible to all" was no longer unique. Testing showed that the audience wanted the centre to be more challenging, to feature art as well as science and to be more inclusive. A new manifesto was produced in response to these themes, and the over 400 new names were considered before deciding on We The Curious. The name was tested with members, focus groups, volunteers and staff and it tested at 92% positive. We The Curious is currently working on Project What If, funded by the Wellcome Trust as part of the Inspiring Science fund along with 16 other generous funders. We The Curious is currently run by a team of over 140 part-time and full-time staff, led by Donna Speed as chief executive officer.

2022 fire 
On 9 April 2022 a fire broke out of the building's roof, prompting evacuation of visitors and staff and closure of a section of Anchor Road. Following the fire, it was announced that We The Curious would remain closed until at least January 2023.

Current exhibits 
The exhibitions are themed into various areas, some of which are permanent features, others change on a periodic basis. The ground floor of We The Curious is being re-fitted with brand new exhibits in 2020.

 The Planetarium – The UK's first 3D planetarium with seasonal, presenter-led star shows for all ages.
 The Tinkering Space – Opened in July 2016. A space on the first floor to design, create and invent with a giant ball run, a Baxter (robot), Nao (robot), 3D printers and an air table.
 Food – A kitchen and living greenhouse with exhibits about the science of food and programming spaces to have a go at making your own. 
 Live Lab – An evolving lab space where visitors can experience current science including practical lab skills, research and dissections.
 All About Us – This opened in Spring 2011 and has 50 interactive exhibits which allow visitors to discover how amazing the human body is.
 Real Brain – As part of the All About Us exhibition, We The Curious has an exhibit that displays a real human brain. The exhibit has been produced to give visitors an understanding of medical science research.
 Animate It! – this exhibition was developed with Aardman Animations. Visitors can make their own animated films (2D and 3D), see a film set from Wallace & Gromit's 'A Matter of Loaf and Death', or make Morph spin in a Praxinoscope.
 Our World – Allows visitor to discover the world around us through investigation. Includes Icy Bodies, Giant Bubbles and the Turbulent Orb.
 Your Amazing Brain – The second large section on the ground floor, this area deals with the human brain, in particular optical illusions and memory.
 Studio TV (Then: Curiosity Zone) – Incorporating most of the upper level, this area deals with sound, light, force, magnets, and also includes a mock television studio.
 Space Gallery – This area includes exhibits about space travel and discovery, and the 3D Planetarium, in which 6-8 shows are given daily.
 Studio TV – a mock television studio.

We The Curious has its own exhibition workshop on site. Many of the interactive exhibits on the exhibition floor have been made by the workshop team in house, including the distinctive 'Hamster wheel' of the 'Wet Move-it' exhibition.

We The Curious is housed in a former railway goods shed, which was renovated to house the centre. The renovations included the addition of a large glass atrium to the North of the building, and stainless-steel sphere to the south, housing the planetarium. The architect behind the renovation was Chris Wilkinson.

As the temperature within the building rises, the crystals within the balls melt, taking in the heat and cooling the building. As the building cools, the salts crystallise again, giving out heat. In this way, the tank helps keep the temperature within the centre constant.

Former exhibits 

 Wildwalk - Wildwalk was an Ecology Science centre, which contained two artificial rainforests, aquariums, hands-on exhibits, and live animal exhibits. The centre comprised a large building (previously a lead-works building) with a 'living rainforest' attached to the southern side, and was designed by Michael Hopkins & Partners. The centre housed animals, including butterflies, crabs, chameleons, frogs, finches, partridges, piranhas, seahorses, scorpions, snakes, spiders, tarantulas, triggerfish: in total over 150 species from all major animal groups. Following Wildwalks closure, all animals and plants were re-homed to other zoos and natural history venues. Some elements of the exhibits from Wildwalk have been incorporated into Explore.

 IMAX – Housed in the same building as Wildwalk, the IMAX theatre was the first of the three At-Bristol attractions to open, on 20 April 2000. Since opening, the theatre received over 1.1 million visitors, and screened 70 films. The longest running film, and thus that with the highest attendance figures, was Cyberworld 3D.

Charitable status 
As an educational charity, We The Curious fundraises to fulfil their vision 'to create a culture of curiosity'. This work includes specific inclusion projects, outreach work to groups who are unable to visit We The Curious, and bringing hard to reach groups to We The Curious. These groups include community groups, low-income schools and hospitals. Much of this work is made possible by the work of volunteers who have been part of We The Curious since 2006 We The Curious has also recently embarked on a career ladder scheme with partnership school City Academy.

Venue hire  
There are rooms and roof terraces above the exhibition space that are used for private hire. These have been used by organisations such as Sky News, the BBC and FameLab as well as other conferences, meetings and events. These spaces have also been used for weddings and civil partnerships. We The Curious also hires out the exhibition floor, Planetarium, Millennium Square and Anchor Square.

Sustainability 
Since its inception sustainability has been a key part of the We The Curious project. The We The Curious building (formerly Explore and At-Bristol) is an example of low-energy design with a phase-change storage tank enabling air source heat pumps to heat and cool the building using only night surplus electricity.

At-Bristol (as the centre was then known) joined the 10:10 project in 2010 in a bid to reduce their carbon footprint. One year later they announced that they had reduced their carbon emissions (according to 10:10's criteria) by 12%.

Since 2010 We The Curious has been on an intense sustainability drive to improve its performance in all areas of sustainability whilst also ensuring that the subject is included in its educational and promotional work. In 2011 At-Bristol was awarded a Gold Green Tourism Award and a West of England Carbon Champions Carbon Champion Award and in 2012 a Silver South West Sustainable Tourism Award.

March 2012 also saw At-Bristol's environmental performance being improved further with the installation of a 50-kilowatt peak solar photovoltaic array to produce electricity for the building from the sun.

We The Curious now has 'Strive for Sustainable futures' as one of the core pillars of its manifesto, and is constantly reviewing its environmental impact in order to try and become carbon neutral in line with the Bristol One City Plan. Part of this is to use the platforms available to educate the public about pressing environmental concerns, such as supporting sustainable palm oil and reducing air pollution.

IMAX 3D Cinema in 2006 and 2007  
CyberWorld 3D (2006) 
IMAX Deep Sea 3D (27 January 2007)

References

External links 

 Official We The Curious Site
 The Exploratory (archive site)
 Director of At-Bristol's response to a critical article in Nature (original article is only available on pay or subscription)

Tourist attractions in Bristol
Grade II listed buildings in Bristol
Buildings and structures celebrating the third millennium
Science centres in England
Bristol Harbourside
Museums in Bristol